Havis may refer to:

Havis, Inc., an American manufacturing company

People with the surname
Allan Havis (born 1951), American playwright

See also
Havis Amanda, a statue in Helsinki, Finland